The 2015 European Beach Handball Championship was held in Lloret de Mar, Spain from 30 June to 5 July 2015.

Format
Men's competition contains twelve teams, split into two groups of six teams while women's competition contains fourteen teams, split in two groups of seven teams. After playing a round-robin, the four top ranked team advanced to the Main Round. Every team kept the points from preliminary round matches against teams who also advanced. In the main round every team had 2 games against the opponents they did not face in the preliminary round. All teams advanced to the Quarter-finals. The two bottom ranked team from each preliminary round group were packed into one group. The points won against the teams who were also in this group were valid.

Matches were played in sets, the team that wins two sets is the winner of a match. When teams are equal in points the head-to-head result was decisive.

Men

Seeding

Preliminary round

Group A

Group B

Main round

Group I

Group II

Placement round 9−12

Knockout stage

Championship bracket

5–8th place bracket

Final standings

Women

Seeding

Preliminary round

Group A

Group B

Main round

Group I

Group II

Placement round 9−14

Knockout stage

Championship bracket

5–8th place bracket

Final standings

References

European Beach Handball Championship
Beach Handball Championship
Beach Handball Championship
2015 in Spanish sport
International handball competitions hosted by Spain